The 1953–54 NHL season was the 37th season of the National Hockey League. Six teams each played 70 games. The Detroit Red Wings defeated the Montreal Canadiens in the final to win the team's sixth championship.

League business
National Hockey League (NHL) team owners gave notice to terminate the professional-amateur agreement with the Canadian Amateur Hockey Association (CAHA). The Canadian Press reported that the decision was to protect investments into amateur teams and to improve the financial return. The NHL proposed a new national junior ice hockey playoff format solely for teams sponsored by the NHL, instead of the existing Memorial Cup championship. CAHA president W. B. George predicted that the NHL would not last three years without the CAHA, and stated that it would end the current system which allowed a three-game tryout for an amateur with a professional team. In August 1953, the CAHA and NHL agreed in principle to a proposal that resumed east-west transfers of junior players, and increased the amount of profits to junior teams sponsored by the NHL. At the semi-annual meeting, the CAHA agreed to distribute playoffs funds proportional to the profit on a series-by-series basis, but rejected the request to resume transfers from west to east.

Regular season
The New York Rangers decided to drop Gump Worsley and went with Johnny Bower in goal this season. Bower did well, but not well enough to get the Rangers into the playoffs. However, the Rangers managed to come up with a fine rookie in Camille Henry who won the Calder Memorial Trophy.

On December 9, the Montreal Canadiens played the Toronto Maple Leafs at Maple Leaf Gardens and the teams set a record of most penalties in a game. The trouble started when Montreal's Eddie Mazur got into a fight with Toronto's George Armstrong in the first period. Both received game misconduct penalties. Early in the second period, Bud MacPherson broke his stick on the ribs of Toronto's Ron Stewart. He chose not to retaliate until a more opportune time. It came at 18:12 of the third period when Stewart and MacPherson collided again. This time they pushed and shoved and the gloves came off and they began to pummel each other. Tom Johnson came to MacPherson's aid by putting a headlock on Stewart and Stewart threw a punch that landed on Johnson's jaw. Stewart pursued MacPherson again, now that he was in combat with Eric Nesterenko of Toronto and soon the benches emptied and everyone was fighting except Maurice Richard and Tim Horton who merely grabbed each other's sweaters. Referee Frank Udvari handed out 36 penalties, including 15 misconducts for a record 204 minutes in penalties. With almost 2 minutes left in the game, only 8 players from each team excluding the goaltenders Gerry McNeil and Harry Lumley, who did battle in the brawl, were permitted to finish the game. Almost forgotten was that Toronto won the game 3–0.

There were persistent rumours that the Chicago Black Hawks would fold due to the poor performance of the team and fans staying away in droves. NHL president Clarence Campbell discussed the problems with Arthur M. Wirtz and it was announced that the rumours were without foundation.

Campbell was busy this year imposing fines and suspensions. As a result of pushing referee Frank Udvari into the boards during a November 12 game, Bernie Geoffrion was fined $250. Later, in a December 20 game, he and Ron Murphy engaged in stick swinging which left Murphy with a broken jaw. Both players were suspended.

There was trouble brewing for Maurice Richard when he ghosted an article in the Samedi Dimanche newspaper, calling NHL president Clarence Campbell a dictator and took exception to Campbell's suspension of Bernie "Boom Boom" Geoffrion for the stick swinging incident. Richard was required to post a $1000 bond and refrain from any more articles.

The Detroit Red Wings were first overall in the National Hockey League for the sixth straight season.

Final standings

Playoffs
After losing four straight games to the Montreal Canadiens, Boston Bruins general manager Art Ross, their manager from the day the Bruins came into the NHL, announced his retirement. He had been grooming Lynn Patrick to succeed him and Patrick took over as general manager.

Playoff bracket

Semifinals

(1) Detroit Red Wings vs. (3) Toronto Maple Leafs

(2) Montreal Canadiens vs. (4) Boston Bruins

Stanley Cup Finals

Awards
The James Norris Memorial Trophy made its debut this season and its first winner was Red Kelly of the Detroit Red Wings. The Norris Trophy goes to the top defenceman each year and was named in honour of James E. Norris, owner of the Detroit Red Wings franchise from 1932 until his death in 1952.

Player statistics

Scoring leaders
Note: GP = Games played, G = Goals, A = Assists, Pts = Points, PIM = Penalties in minutes

Source: NHL

Leading goaltenders

Note: GP = Games played; Min – Minutes played; GA = Goals against; GAA = Goals against average; W = Wins; L = Losses; T = Ties; SO = Shutouts

Coaches
Boston Bruins: Lynn Patrick
Chicago Black Hawks: Sid Abel
Detroit Red Wings: Tommy Ivan
Montreal Canadiens: Dick Irvin
New York Rangers: Frank Boucher
Toronto Maple Leafs: King Clancy

Debuts
The following is a list of players of note who played their first NHL game in 1953–54 (listed with their first team, asterisk(*) marks debut in playoffs):
Doug Mohns, Boston Bruins
Earl Reibel, Detroit Red Wings
Camille Henry, New York Rangers
Johnny Bower, New York Rangers

Last games
The following is a list of players of note who played their last game in the NHL in 1953–54 (listed with their last team):
Woody Dumart, Boston Bruins
George Gee, Chicago Black Hawks
Jack Gelineau, Chicago Black Hawks
Sid Abel, Chicago Black Hawks
Jim McFadden, Chicago Black Hawks
Elmer Lach, Montreal Canadiens
Gaye Stewart, Montreal Canadiens
Doug Bentley, New York Rangers
Max Bentley, New York Rangers
Leo Reise, New York Rangers
Howie Meeker, Toronto Maple Leafs

See also
1953-54 NHL transactions
List of Stanley Cup champions
7th National Hockey League All-Star Game
National Hockey League All-Star Game
1953 in sports
1954 in sports

References

 
 
 
 

 

 

Notes

External links

Hockey Database
NHL.com

 
1953–54 in American ice hockey by league
1953–54 in Canadian ice hockey by league